Saint-Symphorien-sur-Couze is a former commune in the Haute-Vienne department in the Nouvelle-Aquitaine region in west-central France. On 1 January 2019, it was merged into the new commune Saint-Pardoux-le-Lac.

See also
Communes of the Haute-Vienne department

References

Former communes of Haute-Vienne